In 2007 Duke Special headlined five nights at the Belfast Empire, Each night had a different theme, and each show featuring special songs and guests. Duke gave each show a title:

August 19 – Olde Time Music Hall
August 20 – Tales from the silver screen
August 21 – Big band showtime
August 22 – Voices
August 23 – Vaudeville Extravaganza.

The box set contains a DVD of highlights from all five performances, a CD of 18 rarities, b-sides and live recordings entitled Little Revolutions (released separately in 2009), a book of lyrics to around 60 Duke Special songs, and two sets of pin badges.

References

Duke Special albums
2008 compilation albums